Days Like This is a 2001 film directed by Mikael Håfström. It stars Kjell Bergqvist and Carina Johansson. It won two awards at the 2002 Guldbagge Awards.

Cast
 Kjell Bergqvist as Leif
 Carina Johansson as Lena
 Christian Fiedler as Evert
 Ulla-Britt Norrman-Olsson as Siv
 Lia Boysen as Malin

References

External links
 
 

2001 films
2001 drama films
Swedish drama films
Films directed by Mikael Håfström
2000s Swedish films